The Miâara Cemetery is the Jewish Cemetery of the city of Marrakesh, Morocco. It is the largest Jewish cemetery in the country.

History

The Jewish cemetery of Marrakesh, called Beit Mo'ed LeKol Chai or "Miâara", after the street where the entrance to the cemetery is located, Taoulat El Miara, was founded in the 15th century although it is believed the area was used for burial of Jews since as early as the 12th century. This is the ancient cemetery of Marrakesh Jewry where all the righteous of the generation for their generations are buried. Among the rabbis of the generation who are buried there are Rabbi Pinchas HaCohen, who is said to have saved the life of Thami El Glaoui, Rabbi Shlomo Tammuzat, Rabbi Abraham Azoulay and Rabbi Hanania HaCohen. it has separate sections for men, women and children, as per Jewish tradition, a Jew cannot be buried next to a person of the opposite gender that is not their spouse. The cemetery has become a tourist site visited by thousands of Jews from all over the world come, including many Israelis of Moroccan origin.

The cemetery is one of the largest in the country, covering approximately 2,800 dunams and it is located next to the Mellah of Marrakesh. The cemetery has over 20,000 graves, with its left corner dedicated to around 6,000 children who died during a typhus epidemic in the 19th century; the tombs of the kohanim are painted in blue and located by its entrance The cemetery is maintained by the Jewish community and by a guard who is there 24 hours a day.

Mausoleums
The cemetery has several mausoleums, including those of some famous Moroccan rabbis, like Rabbi Abraham Azoulay and Rabbi David Hazan. Most of the mausoleums are located on its perimeter.

See also
 Mellah of Marrakesh

References

External links
 Cimetière Juif de Marrakech
 

Marrakesh
Jews and Judaism in Morocco
Jewish cemeteries
Cemeteries in Morocco